David Wreyford Burnford (6 January 1915 – 10 June 1984) was a British medical doctor and rower who competed at the 1936 Summer Olympics.

Life 
Burnford was educated at Jesus College, Cambridge. In 1935 he partnered Thomas Cree to win Silver Goblets at Henley Royal Regatta. In 1936 he was a member of the winning Cambridge boat in the Boat Race.  Later in the year he partnered Cree in the coxless pair representing Great Britain at the 1936 Summer Olympics in Berlin, but was unplaced.

Burnford became a medical doctor and in 1944 was serving as a surgeon lieutenant commander in the Royal Navy. His wife was the novelist Sheila Burnford. He remarried after her death to Sharon Roark.

See also
List of Cambridge University Boat Race crews

References

1915 births
1984 deaths
Alumni of Jesus College, Cambridge
British male rowers
Olympic rowers of Great Britain
Rowers at the 1936 Summer Olympics
Royal Navy officers of World War II